Péter Bakonyi (Buchwald) (born 17 February 1938) is a Hungarian Olympic sabre fencer. He won two Olympic bronze medals, and one World Championship gold medal.

Biography
He was born in Budapest, Hungary, and is Jewish.

In 1966, fencing for Hungary, he won the gold medal in the men's team sabre at the Fencing World Championships.

He won bronze medals for Hungary in the team sabre events at the 1968 and 1972 Summer Olympics. In 1969, he won bronze medals in the individual sabre and team sabre in the Senior Fencing World Championships.

In 2000, he won the gold medal in the Men's Sabre 60+ at the Veteran World Championships.

See also
List of select Jewish fencers

References

External links
 

1938 births
Living people
Hungarian male sabre fencers
Olympic fencers of Hungary
Fencers at the 1964 Summer Olympics
Fencers at the 1968 Summer Olympics
Fencers at the 1972 Summer Olympics
Olympic bronze medalists for Hungary
Olympic medalists in fencing
Fencers from Budapest
Medalists at the 1968 Summer Olympics
Medalists at the 1972 Summer Olympics
Universiade medalists in fencing
Jewish Hungarian sportspeople
Jewish male sabre fencers
Universiade gold medalists for Hungary
20th-century Hungarian people
21st-century Hungarian people